Katherine Lee-Hinton, better known as Deltalina,  is an American flight attendant for Delta Air Lines and was one of the presenters of Delta's onboard safety videos. The first Deltalina safety video was released in February 2008 and became one of the most-watched videos on YouTube.

The Deltalina nickname came from YouTube viewers who, in the comments to the video, compared her looks to those of actress Angelina Jolie.

She was born in Heidelberg, Germany to a military family and was of German and Puerto Rican ancestry, maternal and paternal, respectively. An alumna of Stone Mountain High School, class of 1992, she was hired by Delta in 1997 upon her first attempt. She resided in Melbourne, Florida in 1997 and Buckhead, Atlanta as of 2008.

Safety videos
The original 2008 safety video made the news in the United States (for example, in USA Today, CNN, Wired), Netherlands (De Telegraaf) and Belgium (De Standaard and Het Nieuwsblad), most articles noting that the unusual humor might make passengers pay more attention to the video.

Critical reception
Martin Grant of Forbes wrote in 2012 that the Deltalina video was the first of the "next generation of safety video" and that the "talents" of Deltalina "largely helped" this.

This video, however, was panned (in the book How to Do Things With Videogames) by Ian Bogost because, in Bogost's opinion, the attention that is paid to the videos is given to Lee-Hinton and not to the actual safety instructions, that the video made her into "a minor celebrity", that "In a weird historical inversion, this very much is your father's Pan Am."

Subsequent Delta safety videos
In late 2012, Delta Air Lines made two new safety videos in which Lee-Hinton is not the presenter, but in which she does appear in a cameo role, admonishing against smoking on board with her famous finger wag. 
 In 2014, a younger version of Deltalina did her "finger wag" in a 80s themed safety video.
 In 2015, Deltalina again did her "finger wag", this time admonishing a screaming goat not to smoke, in a safety video featuring Internet memes. This scene later returned in a 2016 Delta safety video.

List of public appearances
 2006: Lee modeled in May–September 2006 presentations and photo sessions for new Delta Air Lines' flight attendant uniforms.
 2007: Lee appeared giving a live safety briefing in the May 22, 2007 episode of The Ellen DeGeneres Show when the entire show took place aboard a Delta flight.
 2008: In September, Lee shot a series of humorous instructional videos for the Atlanta Falcons football team, shown on the large screens at the Georgia Dome in advance of each home game. The videos' theme was "Delta Safety First".
 2009: In March, Lee helped celebrate the opening of the heliport atop the W Hotel in Downtown Atlanta, accompanying developer Hal Barry and his wife in a helicopter which landed there, kicking off the party. Tycoon Barry, inspiration for the protagonist in the Tom Wolfe novel A Man in Full, intended to commute between downtown and his estate  further south. In the same month Lee appeared both in print and video to help kick off the relaunch of Delta's inflight magazine, Sky.
 2010: Lee appeared in a video for the Carter foundation. Also in that year, she did a video to promote Sky Priority benefits for frequent flyers.
 2011: In March, Lee appeared in a video for the 2011 Adobe Summit orientation. In August 2011, Lee appeared in a series of promotional videos for Healthe Trim's diet supplements. On December 14, 2011, she also appeared on CNN offering travel tips.
 2012: In March, Lee was onstage at the 23rd Annual GLAAD Media Awards. In November 2012, she appeared in a print ad for the Atlanta Convention and Visitors Bureau, which appeared in Delta Sky Magazine. In the same month she also appeared in a cameo role in a promotional video for the Atlanta Convention and Visitors Bureau.

Personal life

Lee was born in Heidelberg, Baden-Württemberg, Germany, to a Puerto Rican father (died in December 2013) and a German mother. Her father was in the military, and the family moved around a lot. Lee graduated from Stone Mountain High School in Metro Atlanta in 1992.

References

Sources
 "Fame and Marriage Proposal for Deltalina", The Atlanta Journal-Constitution
 Richard L. Eldredge, "Delta’s famed attendant, others offer travel packing tips", The Atlanta Journal-Constitution, November 21, 2008
 "Delta's Red-Headed Flight Attendant a Hit on YouTube in Airline's Safety Video", FOX News, March 23, 2008

External links
 Official in-flight video (2008), Delta Air Lines

Delta Air Lines people
Flight attendants
Living people
Viral videos
American people of German descent
Year of birth missing (living people)

fr:Delta Air Lines#Deltalina
nl:Delta Air Lines#Deltalina en veiligheidsvideo's